Alpine is an unincorporated community in Talladega County, Alabama, United States, located southwest of Talladega and northwest of Childersburg. It is known to Alabama residents as the site of YMCA Camp Cosby. The community gained its name from Alpine, a plantation owned by the Welch family. Over time, a town grew up around the plantation when a railroad came through. Initially known as Welchs Depot, it eventually came to be known as Alpine, in honor of the plantation.

Demographics

Alpine Precinct (1900-1950)

Alpine has never reported separately as an unincorporated community on the U.S. Census. However, the 6th precinct of Talladega County was named for Alpine beginning in 1900 (renamed from Mardisville precinct), and it continued to report until 1950. In 1930 and 1940, when the census reported racial statistics for the precincts, it had a Black majority.

In 1960, the precinct was merged as part of a larger reorganization of counties into the census division of Sycamore-Winterboro.

Photo gallery

References

External links
Camp Cosby website
Salem Presbyterian Church website

Unincorporated communities in Talladega County, Alabama
Unincorporated communities in Alabama